Johnny Sheehan (born 1975) is an Irish former hurler who played for East Cork club St Catherine's. He played for the Cork senior hurling team for two seasons, during which time he usually lined out at midfield.

Sheehan began his hurling career at club level with St Catherine's. After beginning his career at juvenile and underage levels, he eventually broke onto the club's top adult team and experienced his first success in 1994 when the club won the Cork Intermediate Championship title. He later won a Cork Premier Intermediate Championship title in 2004 and promotion to the top flight of Cork hurling.

At inter-county level, Sheehan was part of the Cork under-21 team that won the Munster Championship in 1996. He joined the Cork senior team in 1997. From his debut, Sheehan was better known as a panellist rather than a member of the starting fifteen and made a number of National League and Championship appearances in a career that ended in 2000. During that time he was part of Cork's All-Ireland Championship-winning team in 1999. Sheehan also secured two Munster Championship medals.

Honours
St Colmans
Harty Cup x 2
All Ireland x 1

St Catherine's
Cork Premier Intermediate Hurling Championship (1): 2004
Cork Intermediate Hurling Championship (1): 1994

Cork
All-Ireland Senior Hurling Championship (1): 1999
Munster Senior Hurling Championship (2): 1999, 2000
Munster Under-21 Hurling Championship (1): 1996

References

1975 births
Living people
St Catherine's hurlers
Cork inter-county hurlers